Line 4 of the Guadalajara light rail system will be the future fourth line of the Guadalajara light rail system. Daily ridership is estimated to be  passengers, and construction will cost  billion Mexican pesos (approximately 460 million USD).

History

Original project 

In 2009, the then mayor of Tlajomulco –Enrique Alfaro Ramírez– proposed a failed project for a Line 3 of the Guadalajara light rail to the Jalisco State Congress; however it was rejected by partisan majority. From there, it would turn east to take the Luis Covarrubias street until a small fork to retake the Patria Sur Avenue, then it would turn south running next to the FF.CC. Guadalajara-Manzanillo railway track until the Hacienda Santa Fe colony, in the municipality of Tlajomulco.

With this project it was intended to benefit to more than  people, as the zones where the line would be built on suffer from a strong recession in public transport matter. Nevertheless, the Line 4 project has been already contemplated by the SCT, with a similar route to that suggested in 2009.

Current project 
After many years of many proposals to bring connectivity to the Municipality of Tlajomulco with the rest of the Guadalajara metropolitan area, both the then candidate for the presidency, Andrés Manuel López Obrador, and the candidate for governor, Enrique Alfaro Ramírez, spoke independently in their 2018 campaigns about the construction of the line 4 of the electric train towards the Tlajomulco Centre. After both candidates resulted elected, a López Obrador spokesman announced the Isla Raza to Santa Fe project, route that had been proposed and analysed years before during the Emilio González Márquez administration.

López Obrador and Alfaro discussed and agreed to resume this project and more studies about the route to be built were made and some adjustments were considered. The announcement of this work caused mixed reactions among the businessmen; the Council of Industrial Chambers of Jalisco presented negative to the project, while the Mexican Chamber of the Building Industry of Jalisco pronounced in favour.

In 2020, some doubts arose about the backing of López Obrador to the project signed in Mexico City by the governor and the president in July 2019. It was planned to start the preliminary works for the new line in October of that same year.

In 2021 the Line 4 of the Guadalajara light rail system got once again a back turn from the president Andrés Manuel López Obrador, since there was no money designated for the works from the federal budget of 2021, as informed by the Secretariat of Finance even though the federal government said to endorse to the project. In a meeting with the Mexican president, Andrés Manuel López Obrador, the Jalisco governor, Enrique Alfaro, affirmed that the Line 4 already had the technical studies for its construction and assured that the preliminary works would begin in October 2021.

The construction was planned for the end of October 2021, but the works did not start until 2022. The preliminary works began on May 6, 2022, and the formal start of the works was on May 22, 2022, with the presence of the governor, the mayors of the Guadalajara metropolitan area and some special guests. It has been planned to finish the works in March 2024, that is, in a record time of 22 months.

Characteristics 
It will run from Las Juntas in the Miravalle colony until the Municipal head of Tlajomulco in the south of the city. It will connect with the Fray Angélico bus station in the terminal of  through a multimodal transfer centre (CETRAM), and will run on the railway right of way Guadalajara-Manzanillo.

This line will have budget of 9 billion pesos through a federal, state and private funding, and will benefit  users. The works began in May 2022 and it has been planned to finish by March 2024, opening that same year. Once open, it will become the longest line of the Guadalajara rail system.

Stations

Gallery

See also

References 

Guadalajara light rail system
Transportation in Guadalajara, Jalisco